The Souk Al-Manakh stock market crash was the 1982 stock market crash of Kuwait's unofficial stock market, the Souk Al-Manakh. The Al-Manakh market was housed in an air-conditioned parking garage in the historic area of Jibla, Kuwait City. The market was specialized in highly speculative and unregulated non-Kuwaiti companies. At its peak, its market capitalization was the third highest in the world, behind only the U.S. and Japan, and ahead of the U.K. and France.

Background
The large oil revenues of the 1970s left many private individuals with substantial funds at their disposal. These funds prompted a speculation boom in the official stock market in the mid-1970s that culminated in a small crash in 1977. The government's response to this crash was to bail out the affected investors and to introduce stricter regulations. This response unintentionally contributed to the far larger stock market crash of the 1980s by driving the least risk-averse speculators into the technically illegal alternate market, the Souk Al-Manakh. The Souk Al-Manakh had emerged parallel to the official stock market, which was dominated by several older wealthy families who traded, largely among themselves, in very large blocks of stock. The Souk Al-Manakh soon became the market for the new investor and, in the end, for many old investors as well.

Crash
Share dealings using postdated checks created a huge unregulated expansion of credit. The crash of the unofficial stock market finally came in August 1982, when a dealer presented a postdated check from a young Passport Office employee  for payment and it bounced. By September 1982, the Kuwaiti Ministry of Finance ordered all dubious checks to be turned in for clearance, and shut down the Souk Al-Manakh. The official investigation summed the value of worthless outstanding checks at the equivalent of US$94 billion from about 6,000 investors. Kuwait's financial sector was badly shaken by the crash, as was the entire economy. 

The crash prompted a recession that rippled through society as individual families were disrupted by the investment risks of particular members made on family credit. The debts from the crash left all but one bank in Kuwait technically insolvent, held up only by support from the Central Bank. Only the National Bank of Kuwait, the largest commercial bank, survived the crisis intact. In the end, the government stepped in, devising a complicated set of policies, embodied in the Difficult Credit Facilities Resettlement Program.  The implementation of the program was still incomplete in 1990 when the Iraqi invasion changed the entire financial picture.

Effects
Coupled with reduced oil revenues caused by the ongoing Iran–Iraq War, the Souk Al-Manakh crash helped to push the entire Gulf region into a recession.

Popular culture 
The crash was depicted in the 1983 play Fursan Al-Manakh (The Knights of Al-Manakh) starring Abdulhussain Abdulredha.

References

Sources
 Library of Congress Country Studies - Kuwait
 A detailed description of the Kuwait stock market crash from stock-market-crash.net
 Darwiche, Fadwa Adel (1986). The Gulf Stock Exchange crash: the rise and fall of the Souq Al-Manakh. London: Croom Helm. . .

1982 in Kuwait
1982 in economics
August 1982 events in Asia
September 1982 events in Asia
Stock market crashes
Economic history of Kuwait
1982 disasters in Kuwait